Anticachexia  (AN-tee-kuh-KEK-see-uh) is a drug or effect that works against cachexia (loss of body weight and muscle mass).

See also
Cachexia#Management

External links 
 National Cancer Institute Dictionary - Definition of Anticachexia

Drugs_acting_on_the_gastrointestinal_system_and_metabolism